Childers Creek is a stream in the U.S. state of Georgia. It is a tributary to Middle Creek.

Childers Creek has the name of a pioneer citizen.

References

Rivers of Georgia (U.S. state)
Rivers of Warren County, Georgia
Rivers of McDuffie County, Georgia